The Bangladesh and Thailand women's cricket teams toured the Netherlands in August 2019 to play Women's Twenty20 International (WT20I) matches in preparation for the 2019 ICC Women's World Twenty20 Qualifier. Bangladesh played two WT20I matches against Thailand, with one match against the host nation in between those matches. The venue for all of the matches was Sportpark Maarschalkerweerd in Utrecht. Prior to the series, Thailand and the Netherlands also competed in the 2019 Netherlands Women's Quadrangular Series.

Bangladesh won all three matches of the series.

WT20I matches

Bangladesh v Thailand 1st WT20I

Netherlands v Bangladesh only WT20I

Bangladesh v Thailand 2nd WT20I

References

External links
 Series home at ESPN Cricinfo

Associate international cricket competitions in 2019